Jindřichův Hradec is a town in the South Bohemian Region of the Czech Republic. It has about 21,000 inhabitants. The historic town centre is well preserved and is protected by law as an urban monument reservation.

Administrative parts

Town parts of Jindřichův Hradec I–V and villages of Buk, Děbolín, Dolní Radouň, Dolní Skrýchov, Horní Žďár, Matná, Otín, Políkno and Radouňka are administrative parts of Jindřichův Hradec.

Geography
It lies in the Křemešník Highlands.

The town is situated on the Nežárka river, on the shore of Vajgar pond, which is one of the symbols of the town. It is a  large fish pond established in 1399. There is a significant amount of other fish ponds in the municipal territory.

History
The predecessor of today's town was a Slavic gord. The first written mention of Jindřichův Hradec is from 1220, when a Gothic castle was built on the site of the former gord by owner of the manor Jindřich I Vítkovec, founder of the line of lords of Hradec. In the mid-13th century, a settlement was founded by the castle and named after founder of the castle. The current name Jindřichův Hradec is documented first in 1410.

In the late 16th century, when Jindřichův Hradec was owned by last members of the Hradec family, the town has reached the peak of its development. The houses and the castle were rebuilt from Gothic into the Renaissance style, and the town spread beyond the town walls. After the Thirty Years' War in 1654, Jindřichův Hradec was the second largest town in the Kingdom of Bohemia with 405 houses. Soon after, however, it lost its political importance, and in the end of the 17th century, economic importance also declined.

In 1773 and 1801 respectively, the town was damaged by large fires, and many houses have undergone building modifications. Part of the town walls was demolished and a new large park was established on the border between Old Town and New Town. In 1887, the town was connected by railway with Veselí nad Lužnicí and Jihlava.

Demographics

Economy
The town's economy is focused mainly on services. The largest employer in the town is the hospital.

Transport
There is a narrow-gauge railway leading from Jindřichův Hradec to Nová Bystřice. It is operated by Jindřichohradecké místní dráhy company. It serves mostly as a tourist attraction.

Education
A gymnasium, today known as Gymnázium Vitězslava Nováka, was founded in 1595, making it one of the oldest non-university schools in Central Europe.

Sport
The town's basketball club is GBA Lions Jindřichův Hradec. It played in the National Basketball League until 2018.

Sights

The historic centre of Jindřichův Hradec is formed by the Míru Square with adjacent streets and the castle. The landmarks of the square are a former Gothic town hall, rebuilt several times, and Langer's house, originally a Gothic building, later rebuilt in the Renaissance style.

The town castle and palace is the third largest in the country after those in Prague and Český Krumlov.

The regional museum is located in a Renaissance building that was once the Jesuit seminary. It appeared in the town in 1882 and is one of the oldest regional museums in Bohemia. The most well-known item in the museum is the Krýza's crèche, the largest mechanical nativity scene in the world according to the Guinness Book of World Records.

Sacral monuments
There are several churches in the town, the most notable are the three in the historic centre: Church of Saint John the Baptist with the nearby building that once housed minorite monks and was later an infirmary, Church of Saint Mary Magdalene, and Church of Ascension of the Virgin Mary.

Other churches include Church of Saint Catherine with a Franciscan monastery, Church of the Holy Trinity, Church of Saint James the Great, Church of Saint Wenceslaus, Evangelical church, and former Church of Saint Elizabeth.

The Jewish cemetery was founded around 1400. The oldest preserved tombstone is from 1638.

Notable people

Adam Václav Michna z Otradovic (1600–1676), organist, composer and poet
Antonín Reichenauer (c.1694–1730), Baroque composer
Florian Baucke (1719–1779), Jesuit missionary
Hanuš Schwaiger (1852–1912), painter
Antonín Rezek (1853–1909), political historian
Stanislaus von Prowazek (1875–1915), zoologist and parasitologist
Kurt Adler (1907–1977), Jewish Austrian chorus master, music conductor, author and pianist
Karel Berman (1919–1995), Jewish opera singer and composer
Vladimír Špidla (born 1951), politician, Prime Minister of the Czech Republic
Renáta Tomanová (born 1954), tennis player
Pavel Kroupa (born 1963), Czech-Australian astrophysicist
Václav Chalupa (born 1967), rower
Karel Poborský (born 1972), footballer
Leoš Friedl (born 1977), tennis player
Petr Fical (born 1977), German ice hockey player
Pavel David (born 1978), footballer
Aleš Kotalík (born 1978), ice hockey player
Jan Marek (1979–2011), ice hockey player
Zbyněk Michálek (born 1982), ice hockey player
Milan Michálek (born 1984), ice hockey player

Twin towns – sister cities

Jindřichův Hradec is twinned with:
 Dunajská Streda, Slovakia
 Neckargemünd, Germany
 Sárospatak, Hungary
 Zwettl, Austria

See also
Asteroid 21873 Jindřichůvhradec, named in honour of the town

References

External links

Official tourist portal
Jindřichův Hradec Castle
Travel guide

 
Populated places in Jindřichův Hradec District
Cities and towns in the Czech Republic
Castles in the Czech Republic
Historic Jewish communities
Jewish communities in the Czech Republic